USS Bellatrix may refer to the following ships operated by the United States:

 , an attack cargo ship commissioned in 1942; transferred to Peru in 1963; scrapped in 1991.
 , commissioned 18 November 1961 at Puget Sound Naval Shipyard, Bremerton, Washington.
 , a ship of the Military Sealift Command, delivered in 1973.

Sources

United States Navy ship names